Marcel Moens (born 1 February 1892, date of death unknown) was a Belgian speed skater. He competed in four events at the 1924 Winter Olympics.

References

1892 births
Year of death missing
Belgian male speed skaters
Olympic speed skaters of Belgium
Speed skaters at the 1924 Winter Olympics
Place of birth missing